The Rochester Knighthawks were a lacrosse team based in Rochester, New York, that played in the National Lacrosse League (NLL). The 2014 season was the 20th in franchise history. The Knighthawks won their third consecutive Champion's Cup becoming the first team in NLL history to win three straight league championships. Dan Dawson was the Most Valuable Player of the Champion's Cup Finals.

Regular season

Current standings

Game log
Reference:

Playoffs

Game log
Reference:

* 10-minute series tiebreaker mini-game

Roster

See also
2014 NLL season

References

Rochester Knighthawks seasons
Rochester
Rochester Knighthawks